Sir Henry Stapylton, 1st Baronet ( 1617 - 26 March 1679) was an English politician who sat in the House of Commons in 1648 and 1660.

Stapylton was the son of Brian Stapylton and his wife Frances Slingsby, daughter of Sir Henry Slingsby  of Scriven.

In 1648, Stapylton was elected Member of Parliament for Boroughbridge in the Long Parliament but was excluded by the end of the year under Pride's Purge.

In 1660, Stapylton was elected MP for Boroughbridge in the Convention Parliament. In 1660 he was created baronet of Myton.
 
Stapylton married Elizabeth Darcy, daughter of Conyers Darcy, 1st Earl of Holderness. His son Bryan succeeded him in the baronetcy.

References

1617 births
1679 deaths
Baronets in the Baronetage of England
People from Boroughbridge
Place of birth missing
Year of birth uncertain
English MPs 1640–1648
English MPs 1660